Alfredo Duhalde Vásquez (June 30, 1898 – April 10, 1985) was a Chilean politician who served twice as provisional president in 1946.

Duhalde was born in the city of Río Bueno, the son of  Pedro Duhalde and of Zoila Vasquez. After completing his primary schooling in his natal town, he completed his secondary education at the Liceo de Aplicación in Santiago, where he graduated in 1916. He then studied law at the Universidad de Chile.  He married Yolanda Heufmann, and together they had 6 children: Yolanda, René, Sara, Carmen, Marta and Sonia.

He joined the army and was commissioned as a Cavalry Lieutenant. Later he dedicated himself to work his lands in the areas of Río Bueno and La Unión. He was one of the founders of the Banco Agrícola (Agricultural Bank). He joined the Radical Party and was elected a deputy in 1924 for Llanquihue and Carelmapu. In 1933 he was re-elected, this time as a deputy for Valdivia, Osorno y La Unión.

In 1939, President Pedro Aguirre Cerda appointed him Minister of Defense, position he held until 1940, and then again between 1942 and 1944 under President Juan Antonio Rios. In 1945 he was elected a Senator for Valdivia, Osorno, Llanquihue, Aysén, Chiloé and Magallanes. On September 26 of the same year, he was appointed Minister of the Interior, and assumed as vice president during the absence of President Rios, who had travelled to the United States. President Ríos returned and reassumed power on December 3, but by then he was already very ill and had to hand over his powers to Duhalde again a little more than a month later on January 17, 1946.

Duhalde assumed as vice president again until the death of President Rios, on June 27, when he became Acting President. On August 3 of the same year, he stepped down once again in order to run in his party's primaries for the upcoming presidential election, which he lost to Gabriel González Videla, who went on to win the general election later that year.   He resumed as vice president on August 13, having been replaced in the interim by Vice Admiral Vicente Merino, and continued in office until October 17, when he finally stepped down completely, being replaced by his minister of the Interior, Juan Antonio Iribarren.

He remained a Senator until 1953, when he retired permanently from politics. Duhalde also was director and president of the Banco Osorno- La Unión (1960–1966), Presidente of the Athletic Federation of Chile, partner of the Duhalde, Dibarrant and Co. and honorary director of Colo-Colo F.C. He died in the city of Santiago in 1985.

External links
 Official biography  
 Biography  

1898 births
1985 deaths
People from Ranco Province
Chilean people of Basque descent
Chilean people of French descent
Radical Party of Chile politicians
Liberal Party (Chile, 1849) politicians
National Party (Chile, 1966) politicians
Radical Democracy (Chile) politicians
Presidents of Chile
Chilean Ministers of Defense
Chilean Ministers of the Interior
Deputies of the XXXIV Legislative Period of the National Congress of Chile
Deputies of the XXXVII Legislative Period of the National Congress of Chile
Members of the Senate of Chile
Candidates for President of Chile